Harry Creswell may refer to:

 Harry T. Creswell (1850–1914), American lawyer and state senator
 Harry Bulkeley Creswell (1869–1960), British architect and author